Sir James MacKenna  (15 August 1872 – 3 April 1940) was a Scottish-Indian civil servant who served as a director of agriculture in India and headed various committees that promoted scientific agriculture in India.

MacKenna was the son of Reverend Robert MacKenna of Dumfries. He was educated at Dumfries Academy and at the University of Edinburgh and Balliol College, Oxford. He joined the Indian Civil Services in 1894 and was posted in Burma. He married Esther Florence in 1902. He became a Director of Agriculture in 1906 and became an advisor and director of the Agricultural Research Institute at Pusa in 1916 serving until 1920. He presided over the Indian Cotton Committee from 1917 to 1918.

He received a Delhi Durbar Medal in 1911 and was a member of the Royal Commission on Agriculture in India from 1926 to 1927. He was made CIE in 1917 and knighted in 1925.

References

External links 
Agriculture in India (1915)

Indian civil servants
Agriculture in India
Companions of the Order of the Indian Empire
1872 births
1940 deaths
Knights Bachelor